Anil Kumar Awana is an Indian politician who is a member of the Uttar Pradesh Legislative Council representing the Bulandshahar Local Authorities constituency. He is a member of the Bahujan Samaj Party. He belongs from a strong political family based in gautam budh nagar. His father Narpat Singh served as village head man for several years, his wife Usha Awana was zila panchayat sadasya and his brother Satish Awana was president of uttar pradesh jal nigam.

References 

Living people
Members of the Uttar Pradesh Legislative Council
Bahujan Samaj Party politicians from Uttar Pradesh
1968 births